Cecropia longipes is a species of plant in the family Urticaceae. It is found in Colombia and Panama. It is threatened by habitat loss.

References

longipes
Endangered plants
Taxonomy articles created by Polbot